The Los Angeles Recording School is a private, for-profit college and is a division of the larger Los Angeles Film School. It is located in Hollywood, California. The school offers Associate of Science degree programs in Recording Arts and Music Production. It was founded in 1985 as the Los Angeles Recording Workshop.

Facilities
The Los Angeles Recording School is located in Hollywood on Sunset Boulevard and is a division of the Los Angeles Film School.

Costs
Tuition costs range from $33,000 - $36,000 for an individual associate degree.

Accreditation
The Los Angeles Recording School is a division of The Los Angeles Film School which is accredited by ACCSC, the Accrediting Commission of Career Schools and Colleges.

Student life
The Los Angeles Recording School's campus is an urban one and does not have residential facilities. Instead, students either commute or rent nearby apartments.

References

External links
 

Audio engineering schools
Education in Los Angeles
Educational institutions established in 1985
1985 establishments in California